James Skidmore  may refer to:

James Skidmore (courtier)
James Skidmore (musician)

See also
James Scudamore (disambiguation)